Plan for Chaos is a science fiction novel by British writer John Wyndham, first published in 2009. Wyndham was working on it about the same time as The Day of the Triffids, but it was rejected by publishers on both sides of the Atlantic and never published in his lifetime. Wyndham himself abandoned it, telling Frederik Pohl (his US agent) in 1951: "I've messed about with the thing so much that I've lost all perspective".

It was eventually re-discovered after the John Wyndham Archive was acquired by the University of Liverpool in the UK and was published on the fortieth anniversary of the author's death, under the planned US title Plan for Chaos; the planned UK title had been Fury of Creation.

Plot
The novel begins as a hard-boiled detective thriller in what is presumably New York City, about thirty years or so after the end of the Second World War - a future date at the time of writing. Once the chase is on, the story moves into science fictional themes, and shifts to a hi-tech hideout deep in the jungle, where Nazis are cloning an Aryan master race. While the clones zip around in flying saucers, the Nazi high command prepares for world domination by tricking the US and Russia into starting a nuclear war.

Reception 
Science fiction author M. John Harrison was unimpressed by the book, declaring it "almost unreadable".  Jake Kerridge from The Daily Telegraph, however, stated that Wyndham utilised some of his later themes in the novel resulting in an entertaining read.  Leo Mellor from The Independent conceded that it was not "an extraordinary lost masterpiece", but was nevertheless "fascinating."

See also
 The Boys from Brazil (novel)

References

Further reading
 Ketterer, David. "John Wyndham's World War III and His Abandoned *Fury of Creation* Trilogy."  In *Future Wars: The Anticipations and the Fears*, ed. David Seed (Liverpool: Liverpool University Press, 2012), 103–29.

2009 British novels
English novels
British science fiction novels
Novels by John Wyndham
Novels published posthumously
Liverpool University Press books